Pinta Island (Spanish: Isla Pinta), also known as Abingdon Island, after the Earl of Abingdon, is an island located in the Galápagos Islands group, Ecuador.

Pinta was the original home to Lonesome George, perhaps the most famous tortoise in the Galápagos Islands.  He was the last known representative of the subspecies Chelonoidis nigra abingdonii.

Pinta Island is also home to swallow-tailed gulls, marine iguanas, Galapagos hawks, Galapagos fur seals and a number of other birds and mammals. The most northern major island in the Galápagos, at one time Isla Pinta had a thriving tortoise population.  The island's vegetation was devastated over several decades by introduced feral goats, thus diminishing food supplies for the native tortoises.  A prolonged effort to exterminate goats introduced to Pinta was completed in 1990, and the vegetation of the island is starting to return to its former state.

The elongated island of Pinta is the northernmost of the active Galápagos volcanoes. Pinta is a shield volcano with an extensive underwater footprint originating from NNW-trending fissures.

On January 28, 2008, Galápagos National Park official Victor Carrion announced that 53 sea lions (13 pups, 25 youngsters, 9 males and 6 females) at Pinta had been found killed with their heads caved in. In 2001, poachers killed 35 male sea lions.

See also
 Volcanoes of the Galápagos Islands

References

 

Volcanoes of the Galápagos Islands
Active volcanoes
Shield volcanoes of Ecuador
Islands of the Galápagos Islands
Polygenetic shield volcanoes